Zhang Wei (born 12 February 1986 in Liaoning) is a female Chinese basketball player who was part of the teams that won gold medals at the 2006 Asian Games and the 2010 Asian Games. She competed at the 2008 Summer Olympics in Beijing. She is the twin sister of Zhang Yu.

References

1986 births
Living people
Basketball players at the 2008 Summer Olympics
Chinese women's basketball players
Olympic basketball players of China
Basketball players from Liaoning
People from Chaoyang, Liaoning
Shanxi Flame players
Asian Games medalists in basketball
Basketball players at the 2006 Asian Games
Basketball players at the 2010 Asian Games
Chinese twins
Asian Games gold medalists for China
Medalists at the 2006 Asian Games
Medalists at the 2010 Asian Games
Liaoning Flying Eagles players
Beijing Great Wall players